King Abdullah University Hospital, often abbreviated KAUH, is a teaching hospital in Ar Ramtha, Jordan. It is the largest medical structure in the north of the country, serving approximately one million inhabitants from Ramtha, Irbid, Ajloun, Jerash, and Mafraq governorates.  It is also the teaching hospital affiliated with Jordan University of Science and Technology (JUST), located within the campus adjacent to the university's Medical Faculties Complex.
The hospital is staffed with full-time physicians and surgeons who are faculty members of the JUST Faculty of Medicine,  in addition to many others from the Ministry of Health, and the Royal Medical Services (RMS).

The overall area of various hospital buildings is 95,583 m2, in addition to a double story car park of 9,000 m2 area. The hospital has a bed capacity of 750 which can be increased to 900 beds in an emergency situation. Structurally, the hospital is composed of a 15-story high-rise building, in which all hospital beds are located, and a 3-story low-rise buildings in which patient clinics, diagnostic and other services are located. The hospital is connected to various health science faculties via the ground floor of the low-rise building.

During the COVID-19 pandemic, KAUH was designated by the Jordanian Ministry of Health as the main center for COVID-19 testing and isolation in the north of Jordan and one of 7 such centers in the country.

History

 as seen with the JUST Medical Faculties Complex. Built by Acciona at a cost of approximately $120 million, the King Abdullah University Hospital was the culmination of efforts inaugurated by the late King Hussein bin Talal to address the critical lack of central, advanced medical facilities serving the population of Northern Jordan.  Though King Hussein laid the cornerstone in a 1994 ceremony, he himself did not live to see the completion of the massive hospital, named after his grandfather, the founder of Transjordan, King Abdullah I.  KAUH which was inaugurated by his Majesty King Abdullah II on 28 November 2002, has become, within short period of time, one of the most prominent and reputable non-profit hospitals in Jordan and the region. It opened with founding departments in obstetrics - gynecology, pediatrics, internal medicine, and general and special surgery, in addition to emergency facilities including a medevac heliport.  JUST medical, dentistry, and nursing students complete laboratories, practicals, internship, and residency at or in close conjunction with KAUH and its extensive facilities.

Departments

According to the KAUH official Web site, the hospital includes the following departments:

 General Surgery
 Special Surgery
 Emergency Department
 Pediatrics
 Obstetrics and Gynecology
 Internal Medicine and Dermatology
 Cardiac Center
 Diagnostic X-Ray
 Pathology and Laboratory
 Endoscopy Unit
 Ophthalmology
 Physical Therapy and Rehabilitation
 Physiology Function Test
 Neuroscience
 Nursing
 Information System Department

Administration
Currently, Professor Sa'eb A. Khresat, president of Jordan University of Science and Technology is Chairman of Board of Directors of the hospital, and Prof. Mohammad Alghazo, Professor of urology, is the General Director.

Picture gallery

See also

 Healthcare in Jordan
 Jordan University of Science and Technology (JUST)
 King Hussein Cancer Center
 King Hussein Medical Center
 Princess Haya Biotechnology Center (PHBC)

References

External links

 King Abdullah University Hospital
 Jordan University of Science and Technology

Hospital buildings completed in 2002
Hospitals in Jordan
Hospitals established in 2002
2002 establishments in Jordan